Natalia Marisa Oreiro Iglesias (born 19 May 1977) is a  Uruguayan actress, singer, songwriter, model, television presenter and fashion designer. Oreiro began her career in telenovelas. Since 2008 she has switched to work primarily in films. Oreiro has worked on social awareness shows and events for organizations like Greenpeace and UNICEF, the latter of which designated her as ambassador for Argentina and Uruguay in September 2011. She has been included in Esquire magazine's "The Sexiest Woman Alive Atlas" list.

Her most recognized works in cinema are the films I'm Gilda (Gilda: no me arrepiento de este amor), Super Crazy (Re Loca), and the shortlisted for the Oscar Clandestine Childhood (Infancia Clandestina) and The German Doctor (Wakolda). As an actress she has participated in some of the most important film festivals, such as in Cannes, San Sebastian and Venice, winning many awards for her performances including 3 Silver Condor Awards and a Platino Award.

As a singer, she has sold over 10 million records worldwide and has been nominated for the MTV Video Music Awards and the Latin Grammy Awards among others.

On April 29, 2022 the mini series Yosi, the Regretful Spy', in which she portrays Claudia, premiered worldwide through the Amazon Prime Video streaming platform. In the summer of 2022, the long-awaited mini-series "Santa Evita" premiered, in which she portrayed Evita Peron (Disney Media Distribution)

Life and career

1977–2000: Early life and career beginnings 
Natalia Oreiro, daughter of Carlos Florencio Oreiro Poggio and Mabel Cristina Iglesias Bourié, was born on 19 May 1977. She is of Galician descent. Natalia studied drama at the age of eight and at twelve started auditioning for advertisements. During her teens she appeared in more than 30 television commercials for such trade marks as Coca-Cola, Pepsi and Johnson & Johnson. At the age of 16 she moved to Argentina to work there and unleash her ambition to be a star. She worked as an MTV VJ and in 1995, she landed a role in the soap opera Dulce Ana. She was then cast in the TV series 90-60-90 modelos (1996) and next in Ricos y famosos (1997, playing Valeria). Next, she starred in the Argentinian film Un Argentino en New York (1998). After the movie, Natalia launched her first album, Natalia Oreiro and the single "Cambio Dolor" became the opening theme for her next acting project, the prime time show Muñeca brava (1998–1999). For her performance in Muñeca Brava, Natalia was nominated twice (1998 and 1999) for a Martín Fierro Award as best actress in a leading role.
In 1998, Natalia Oreiro recorded the theme "Paths of the Soul" next to Kennedy Choir[2] and with more than 120 Argentine artists under the direction of Instrumental pianist and conductor Nazareno Andorno.

In January 2000, Natalia was named "Celebrity of the Century" by E! Entertainment Television. She became popular in Russia and Israel due to the success of Muñeca Brava in that country and was even invited to star in a Russian telenovela. In Israel she performed many times on big stages and on many TV shows and won the best telenovela actress award and best theme song "Cambio Dolor" on "VIVA 2000" awards, And in 2002 the Israeli Cable TV had a live competition for finding the Israeli Natalia Oreiro, and she was the honor guest of the evening.

2000–2005: Tu Veneno and Turmalina 
She pursued her musical career with the next album Tu Veneno and presentations in Gala de la Hispanidad, Gala de Murcia (both in Spain) and Festival de la Calle 8 in Miami. Her most important appearance was in the prestigious Latin television show Sábado Gigante Internacional, hosted by Don Francisco. Natalia's major achievement at this time was her music performance in Chile at Viña del Mar Festival 2000 for which she was crowned Queen of that event. The album scored a Latin Grammy nomination for Best Female Pop Vocal Album, but lost to Christina Aguilera's Mi Reflejo.
[[File:Natyoreirocom.jpg|thumb|upright|left|Oreiro in 2005]]

On 1 June 2002, her third studio album Turmalina was released by BMG Ariola Argentina. Turmalina was produced by Latin record producer Kike Santander and is a combination of rhythms such as rock, pop and some sort of reminiscent of the 60's and 50's sounds. On this album, Oreiro write and composed the songs: "Alas De Libertad" which is inspired by kids she met some time ago in the city of Jujuy, Argentina; "Mar" tells the love story between a sailor and his girlfriend. Natalia also contributed to the lyrics of "Cayendo". "Que Digan Lo Que Quieran" is Turmalina's first single. Official Uruguayan 2002 World Cup song "Pasión Celeste" is recorded with Fredy Bessio. "Cuesta arriba, cuesta abajo" was opening song of soap opera Kachorra (Runaway Lady). Kachorra ended with a rating lower than 20 points in Argentina.

In March 2003 she started filming her second film Cleopatra together with Norma Aleandro, Leonardo Sbaraglia and Héctor Alterio, under the direction of Eduardo Mignogna, a co-production with Spain. In the middle of 2003, she started a tour for Eastern Europe and Latin America. On 1 March 2004 she started filming El Deseo.

 2006–2014: Sos mi vida, switch to cinema and other works 
In 2006 she joined as the female boxer, Esperanza Munoz, the cast of the telenovela Sos mi vida along with her Muñeca brava co-star Facundo Arana. It was directed by Rodolfo Antúnez and Jorge Bechara and broadcast by Canal 13. It began broadcasting on 16 January 2006 and ended 9 January 2007. During its broadcast averaged 26.9 points overall rating, and ended as the most watched Argentine television fiction ever, until it was displaced by the 2009, telenovela Valientes. It was written by Ernesto Korovsky and Sebastian Parrotta, and won four Martín Fierro Awards and three Clarín Awards.

On 30 April 2008, Oreiro starred in Amanda O which was a series of internet television in Argentina and produced by Dori Media Group. It was the first soap opera ever made for the internet, and was seen by 550,000 users over Novebox.com, from Argentina, Uruguay and Paraguay during its first season and beginning of the second. Later in 2008 she co-starred in the film Las vidas posibles, along with Germán Palacios and Ana Celentano and got nominated for a Silver Condor for best Supporting Actress.

In 2009 she starred with Diego Peretti in Música en espera. The film premiered in Buenos Aires in March 2009 and sold 235,000 tickets. During the same year, she visited several international film festivals to present the film Francia directed by Adrián Caetano, including San Sebastian Film Festival among others.

In 2010 she starred in the film Miss Tacuarembó, a musical comedy, which was co-produced by Uruguay, Argentina and Spain. For her performance, she received the Iris award for the best actress. Oreiro also participated in the soundtrack of the film, performing all the songs. During the same year, she presented Se dice de mí, a program that sought to raise awareness about women's rights.

During the first half of 2011, she starred with Daniel Hendler in My First Wedding, a film comedy directed by Ariel Winograd.

In 2012 she started in Lynch, a series created in Colombia and broadcast throughout Latin America. The same year the film Clandestine Childhood, that takes place during Argentina's last military dictatorship, premiered in Argentina. The film was selected to compete for a nomination in the best foreign film category at the 2013 Oscar awards. For her work in this film Oreiro won the Silver Condor award and the Argentine Academy of Cinematography Arts and Sciences Award for the best actress. At the end of 2012 she returned on stage and performed in Superdiscoteca of the 90s Festival, which took place in St. Petersburg, Russia.

During 2013, she starred in the telenovela Solamente vos, which marked her return to television after a 7-year break. For her performance in the series she won awards for the best comedy actress in Tato Awards and Martín Fierro awards. Her next leading role was in the film The German Doctor, which was shot during 2012 in the city of Bariloche, and premiered in September 2013. This film, became the second in Oreiro's career to be shortlisted by the Academy of Arts and Sciences Cinematographic of Argentina to compete for a nomination in the Oscar Awards at the category best foreign film. She also won awards and nominations for best actress in the Condor de Plata awards, Sur awards, and the Unasur Festival.The film was nominated for Goya award and presented at several international film festivals. 

 2014–2017: Nasha Natasha tour, Entre caníbales and I'm Gilda 
At the end of 2013 she resumed her musical career performing a tour in Eastern Europe called Nasha Natasha Tour Hits (lit. Our Natasha in the Russian, from the Russian diminutive form of Natalia). She also released a new song and video clip, a cover of Gloria Trevi's song "Todos me miraran". With the "Nasha Natasha Tour 2014 ", she toured a total of 19 Russian cities making a total of 34 shows. One of the most important was the one he held at the Olympic Sports Hall in Moscow, which broke a record, as it gathered more than 60 thousand people. She later recorded a new Russian version of "Me muero de amor" («Я умираю от любви»), with a video clip that starred Facundo Arana.

In 2015 she returned to television starring in the dramatic series Entre caníbales, along with Benjamín Vicuña and Joaquín Furriel, and under the direction of Juan José Campanella. The series was broadcast by the Telefe network for Argentina, and by Fox Life for the rest Latin American market.

In 2016 she starred in I'm Gilda reaching 953.120 in Argentina's box office, a film based on the life of the Argentinian singer, Gilda, who died in a car accident in September 1996. The soundtrack of the film became the fourth album in her musical career. In December 2016 she presented the first single of the album, the song Corazón Valiente in collaboration with Ruben Rada. The film was presented at several festivals such as the Miami International Film Festival in 2017 and the Malaga Film Festival the same year, and for her performance she won several awards: Sur Award (2016), Audience Platinum for Best Actress (2017) and Condor Award (2017). She has been at the 2016 Platinum Awards as a host and singing "Garota de Ipanema"  during the presentation.

 2017-2019: Back to stages, Super Crazy and FIFA World Cup 

Her return to music, with the soundtrack of Gilda's film, gave her the opportunity to return to the stage and at the beginning of 2017 she sang at several festivals in Argentina (such as Lincoln, Villa María and Mar del Plata, among others) In Madrid she repeated her role as host of the 2017 Platino Awards (winner of the ''Best Actress'' award from the audience) and the same year she received a Platinum Iris for her career at the 22nd Iris Uruguay Awards.

During 2018, the movie Re Loca was premiered, which reached 759,546 spectators in Argentina's box office, and she released two songs for the FIFA World Cup held in Russia ("United By Love" was included in the official album of the 2018 FIFA World Cup and the song "Mi Pobedim"). She attended the Kids Choice Awards 2018 (winner of a lifetime achievement award) and the Gramado Festival in Brazil (winner of ''Crystal Kikito''). In 2019, it was held her tour called "Unforgettable Tour" with 14 concerts in various cities of Russia, Belarus, Moldova and Armenia. A few months later he returns to Russia to attend the ''New Wave Festival'' in Sochi to sing with Roberto Kel Torres the theme ''Acapulco''. In November 2019, the Fort Lauderdale International Film Festival in the United States awarded her with the ''Career Achievement Award'' for her career.  In Argentina she shooted the films "La Noche Mágica" (Bad Christmas)- Gaston Portal's first film - with Diego Peretti and "Las Rojas" (The Broken Land) with Mercedes Moran. The turn of the year found her in Poland singing some of her greatest hits in front of 120,000 spectators.

 2020–present: Got Talent, La Voz, Evita and Yosi, the Regretful Spy 
At the beginning of 2020, she filmed some scenes for the film Hoy Se Arregla El Mundo by Ariel Winogrand with Leonardo Sbaraglia. During the year she hosted Got Talent Uruguay, which was renewed for a second season broadcast in 2021, and a third broadcast in 2022. On August 6, 2020, Netflix premiered Nasha Natasha worldwide. The documentary directed by Martín Sastre, refers to her special bond with Russia, while revealing aspects of her private life that were unknown until then. The documentary reached the top positions in Uruguay, Argentina and several European countries and also reached position 30th globally.

In 2021, she filmed the first season of the Amazon Prime Video series Yosi, the Regretful Spy, which premiered on April 29, 2022 and follows a spy who infiltrates a Jewish community to gather information that was used to carry out the AMIA bombing.  On February 17, 2022, it officially announced that she would be the host of La Voz, Uruguayan version of The Voice of Holland. In that year, the Star+ series Santa Evita also premiered, in which Oreiro plays Eva Perón.

 Personal life 
In 2001, Oreiro began a relationship with Argentine singer and musician Ricardo Mollo, best known for his career as member of rock bands Sumo and Divididos. They married secretly later that year, on December 31. On 26 January 2012, in a clinic in Buenos Aires, Oreiro gave birth to a boy. The child was named Merlín Atahualpa Mollo Oreiro. She and her son received Russian citizenship on 25 October 2021.

She declared herself as a socialist.

Discography

 Natalia Oreiro (1998)
 Tu Veneno (2000)
 Turmalina (2002)
 Gilda, no me arrepiento de este amor (2016)

 Artistic career 

 Television 

 Filmography 

 Tours 

Awards

 2017 Iris Uruguay Awards: Platinum Iris Award
 2015 Martín Fierro award: Best actress of daily fiction (for Entre caníbales)
 2014 Argentinean Film Critics Association Awards as best actress for "Wakolda"
 2013 Argentine Academy of Cinematography Arts and Sciences Awards as best actress for "Wakolda"
 2013 Martín Fierro Awards: Best lead actress of daily comedy (for Solamente Vos)
 2013 Tato award as best lead actress in comedy, for Solamente vos''
 2013 Argentinean Film Critics Association Awards as best actress for "Infancia clandestina"
 2012 Argentine Academy of Cinematography Arts and Sciences Awards as best actress for "Infancia clandestina"
 2006 Martín Fierro Award as best lead actress in Comedy/Humoristic Program for "Sos mi vida"
 2000 VIVA's (The Israeli telenovellas channel) "VIVA 2000" Award for best actress and best theme song in Muñeca Brava

See also
Natalia Oreiro videography

References

External links 

 (Vevo)

1977 births
Living people
Singers from Montevideo
Actresses from Montevideo
Uruguayan female models
21st-century Uruguayan women singers
Uruguayan pop singers
Uruguayan film actresses
Uruguayan television actresses
Uruguayan socialists
20th-century Uruguayan actresses
21st-century Uruguayan actresses
Uruguayan expatriate actresses in Argentina
Uruguayan expatriates in Russia
Naturalised citizens of Russia
Uruguayan people of Galician descent
Expatriate models in Argentina
UNICEF Goodwill Ambassadors
Uruguayan television presenters
Women in Latin music